Lorens is a Scandinavian given name. Notable people with the name include:

 Lorens Berg, Norwegian teacher and local historian
 Lorens Marmstedt (1908–1966), Swedish film producer
 Lorens Pasch the Elder, Swedish portrait painter

See also
 Loren (name)

Scandinavian given names